Cesi or CESI may refer to:

Places
Cesi, Serravalle di Chienti, a frazione (hamlet) in Marche, Italy
Cesi, Terni, a frazione (hamlet) in Umbria, Italy

Other uses
Czechs, Czech people
Cesi (surname)
CESI (Education)
European Confederation of Independent Trade Unions
Centro Elettrotecnico Sperimentale Italiano
Centre for Economic and Social Inclusion, a British think-tank

See also
CESIS, Italian security website